John Larke (fl. c. 1500 - died 7 March 1544) was an English Catholic priest and martyr, who was executed during the reign of Henry VIII. Larke was a notable personal friend of Thomas More, Lord High Chancellor of England. Larke was beatified in 1886 by Pope Leo XIII.

Life 
Larke studied at Cambridge University, before serving for twenty six years as rector of St. Ethelburga's Bishopsgate in the City of London. He transferred to a prosperous living as rector of Woodford, Essex, before returning to London four years later, in 1530, when Sir Thomas More appointed him  vicar of Chelsea.

Larke allegedly swore the Oath of Supremacy in 1534 but, as Cresacre More puts it: "the example of St. Thomas More's death so wrought on his mind that afterwards he followed his own sheep and suffered a famous martyrdom."

He was indicted on 15 February 1544, with John Ireland, vicar of Eltham, German Gardiner, and Thomas Heywood. All were condemned, but Heywood recanted on the hurdle and lived to give testimony against Cranmer. The other three, along with another priest from Lancashire, Robert Singleton, whose arrest was never explained, were executed on 7 March 1544.

See also
 List of Catholic martyrs of the English Reformation

References

15th-century births
People from Norfolk
1544 deaths
People associated with the University of Cambridge
English beatified people
Executed English people
16th-century English Roman Catholic priests
Martyred Roman Catholic priests
People executed under Henry VIII
16th-century Roman Catholic martyrs
16th-century venerated Christians
Executed Roman Catholic priests
People executed by Tudor England by decapitation
Forty-one Martyrs of England and Wales